Mathew Charles Goggin (born 13 June 1974) is an Australian professional golfer.

Amateur career
As an amateur, he won the 1995 Australian Amateur, played at Huntingdale Golf Club in Melbourne, Victoria, 2 & 1 over American Jamie Crow. He also won the 1995 Tasmanian Amateur, played at Seabrook Golf Club in Wynyard, Tasmania, over fellow Tasmanian Peter Toogood.

Professional career
Goggin is currently a member of the Nationwide Tour. He was previously a member of the PGA Tour from 2000 to 2003, and regained his card in 2006. He was a member of the Nationwide Tour in 1999, 2004 and 2005. His best PGA Tour year-end money list finish was in 2008 when he finished in 40th. Before playing in the States, he played in Europe. He was a member of the Challenge Tour in 1996 and played on the Challenge Tour and the European Tour in 1997. He was also a member of the European Tour in 1998. He also played on the PGA Tour of Australasia.

Goggin was on the PGA Tour until 2010, when he lost his Tour card after finishing 159th. He went back to the Nationwide Tour for 2011. He won the first tournament of the season, the Panama Claro Championship.

Family
Mathew is divorced from his former wife Felicity who he has two children with. His mother is Australian golfer, Lindy Goggin. His father, Charlie Goggin, now largely retired, had a career as a leading Tasmanian horse trainer. Mathew's sister, Luella Meaburn, has worked with her father as a horse trainer. Mathew's uncles on his father's side, Bill Goggin and Matt Goggin are former Australian rules football players who both played for the Geelong Football Club.

Amateur wins
1995 Australian Amateur, Tasmanian Amateur

Professional wins (9)

PGA Tour of Australasia wins (1)

PGA Tour of Australasia playoff record (1–1)

Web.com Tour wins (5)

Web.com Tour playoff record (0–1)

Challenge Tour wins (2)

Other wins (1)
1994 Tasmanian Open (as an amateur)

Results in major championships

CUT = missed the half-way cut
"T" = tied

Results in The Players Championship

CUT = missed the halfway cut
"T" indicates a tie for a place

Results in World Golf Championships

QF, R16, R32, R64 = Round in which player lost in match play
"T" = Tied

Team appearances
Amateur
Nomura Cup (representing Australia): 1995
Australian Men's Interstate Teams Matches (representing Tasmania): 1993, 1994, 1995

See also
1999 Nike Tour graduates
2002 PGA Tour Qualifying School graduates
2005 Nationwide Tour graduates
2011 Nationwide Tour graduates
List of golfers with most Web.com Tour wins

References

External links

Australian male golfers
PGA Tour golfers
European Tour golfers
PGA Tour of Australasia golfers
Korn Ferry Tour graduates
Sportspeople from Hobart
1974 births
Living people